Qaraqurdlu (also, Qaraqurtlu, Karakurtlu, and Karakurtly) is a village and municipality in the Khachmaz Rayon of Azerbaijan.  It has a population of 3,032.  The municipality consists of the villages of Qaraqurdlu, Hacıqurbanoba, and Gülalan.

References 

Populated places in Khachmaz District